José Tiago Almeida Martins (born 19 August 1988), known as Zé Tiago, is a Portuguese professional footballer who plays for S.C. Covilhã as a midfielder.

Club career
Born in Vila Nova de Gaia, Porto District, Zé Tiago played lower league or amateur football until the age of 26. In May 2014 he signed for Segunda Liga club S.C. Covilhã, making his professional debut on 16 August of that year when he came on as a late substitute in a 2–1 home win over FC Porto B. During his first season, he scored braces against Portimonense SC (4–0) and U.D. Oliveirense (4–1) to help his team to a final fourth position.

Subsequently, Zé Tiago represented still in the second division C.D. Aves and Académica de Coimbra. He helped the former side return to the Primeira Liga after a ten-year absence, contributing 31 matches and four goals to this feat.

References

External links

Portuguese League profile 

1988 births
Living people
Sportspeople from Vila Nova de Gaia
Portuguese footballers
Association football midfielders
Liga Portugal 2 players
Segunda Divisão players
CD Candal players
Boavista F.C. players
AD Oliveirense players
S.C. Covilhã players
C.D. Aves players
Associação Académica de Coimbra – O.A.F. players
C.D. Mafra players
G.D. Chaves players
Varzim S.C. players